Ruth Underwood (born Ruth Komanoff; May 23, 1946) is an American musician best known for playing xylophone, marimba, vibraphone, and other percussion instruments in Frank Zappa and the Mothers of Invention. She collaborated with the Mothers of Invention from 1968 to 1977.

Life and career
Underwood began her music training in the classical tradition, studying both at Ithaca College under Warren Benson and at Juilliard under Saul Goodman (timpani) and Morris Goldenberg (percussion). Throughout 1967, she kept a regular attendance at the Garrick Theater in New York City when Frank Zappa and The Mothers of Invention were the resident band. This resulted in her association with Zappa, beginning in December 1967.

In May 1969 she married keyboardist/saxophonist Ian Underwood, a fellow Zappa musician. They divorced in 1986. Professionally she used both her birth name, Ruth Komanoff, and her married name.

Underwood performed in more than 30 recordings with Zappa or Mothers. Examples of her virtuosity can be heard on tracks including the "Rollo Interior interlude" from "St. Alfonzo's Pancake Breakfast" on the Apostrophe (') album (1974). Other work is documented on Roxy & Elsewhere (1974) and on "Inca Roads", the opening track on One Size Fits All (1975). Underwood can be heard (though not seen) in the soundtrack of the Zappa movie 200 Motels (1971), and the Dub Room Special DVD (1982), which includes performances from the KCET Special A Token Of His Extreme. She also features in the film of the Roxy performances (2015).

During the 1970s, Underwood collaborated in recording sessions for a small number of other performers, most notably with the band Ambrosia, composer Jasun Martz, jazz keyboardist George Duke and drummer Terry Bozzio, the latter two also veterans of Zappa's bands. Underwood also appeared on drums with a rock group named the Hamilton Face Band during 1969, appearing on some of their recordings released by Philips Records and Bell Records. 

By some accounts, she retired from performing by 1982, concentrating instead on her family.

In a 1993 interview she revealed that she played on one final session for Zappa shortly before his death from cancer in December of that year.

In 2008, she commissioned Gordon Stout to write a work for the percussion ensemble Nexus.

She also features in the DVD - DC Collection: Vol. 1 - The Drummers Of Frank Zappa (2009) with Terry Bozzio, Ralph Humphrey, Chester Thompson and Chad Wackerman.

She is the mother of two children, both musicians. She resides in Los Angeles.

Selected discography

Frank Zappa
 Uncle Meat  (1969) 
 200 Motels (1971)
 Over-Nite Sensation  (1973)
 Apostrophe (')  (1974)
 Roxy & Elsewhere (1974)
 One Size Fits All  (1975)
 Zoot Allures  (1976) 
 Zappa in New York  (1978)
 Studio Tan  (1978)
 Sleep Dirt  (1979)
 Thing-Fish  (1984)
 You Can't Do That on Stage Anymore Sampler  (1988)
 You Can't Do That on Stage Anymore, Vol. 1  (1988)
 You Can't Do That on Stage Anymore, Vol. 2  (1988)
 You Can't Do That on Stage Anymore, Vol. 3  (1989) 
 You Can't Do That on Stage Anymore, Vol. 4  (1991)
 You Can't Do That on Stage Anymore, Vol. 6  (1992) 
 The Lost Episodes  (1996)
 Läther  (1996)
 Frank Zappa Plays the Music of Frank Zappa: A Memorial Tribute  (1996)
 Have I Offended Someone?  (1997)
 The Dub Room Special (2007) 
 Wazoo (2007)
 One Shot Deal  (2008)
 Understanding America  (2012)
 Road Tapes, Venue #2 (2013)
 A Token of His Extreme Soundtrack (2013)
 Roxy by Proxy  (2014)
 Roxy the Soundtrack  (2015)
 The Crux of the Biscuit  (2016)
 Meat Light  (2016)
 The Roxy Performances  (2018)
 Halloween 73  (2019)
 Zappa (2020)

The Hamilton Face Band
 The Hamilton Face Band  (1969)
 Ain't Got No Time  (1970)

Jasun Murtz and the Neoteric Orchestra
 The Pillory (1978)

George Duke
 I Love The Blues She Heard My Cry  (1975)
 Liberated Fantasies  (1976)
 My Soul: The Complete MPS Fusion Recordings  (2008)

Billy Cobham
 Inner Conflicts  (1978)

Ambrosia
 Somewhere I've Never Travelled  (1976)

Alphonso Johnson
 Yesterday's Dreams (1976)

Eye to Eye
 Eye to Eye  (1982)

Jasun Martz/The Neoteric Orchestra
 The Pillory  (1981)

Movie appearances
 Zappa
 Roxy: The Movie
 200 Motels
 Baby Snakes
 The Dub Room Special
 The Amazing Mr. Bickford
 Video From Hell
 The True Story of Frank Zappa's 200 Motels
 A Token of His Extreme

References

American marimbists
Women marimbists
The Mothers of Invention members
Living people
1946 births
American percussionists
American women percussionists
American vibraphonists